Minotaur-class cruiser may refer to:

 Minotaur-class cruiser (1906), a class of Royal Navy armoured cruisers launched in 1906–1907
 Minotaur-class cruiser (1943), a class of Royal Navy light cruisers launched in 1943–1945
 Minotaur-class cruiser (1947), a projected class of Royal Navy cruisers, a design both finalised and cancelled in 1947

See also
 Minotaur-class ironclad (1863), a class of Royal Navy ironclads, launched in 1863–1867